The following is a list of episodes for the 1995 TV series, Flipper. The series premiered on October 2, 1995 and concluded on July 1, 2000.

Series overview

Episode list

Season 1 (1995–96)

Season 2 (1996–97)

Season 3 (1998–99)

Season 4 (1999–2000)

External links 
 Episode Guide at epguides.com

Lists of American drama television series episodes